Harold (Henry) William Orth (April 14, 1866 - March 5, 1946) was an American architect.

Background
Harold William Orth was born on a ship en route to the United States from Christiana (Oslo), Norway, on April 14, 1866. His exact date of arrival to the United States is unknown. He was educated at a business college (location unknown). He married Esther Susan Trigalet and settled in St. Paul, Minnesota.

Career

He became a partner of Frank W. Kinney (1855–1929) in Austin, Minnesota, in 1895.  The partnership of Kinney and Orth designed several large buildings in various parts of Minnesota until 1900. The work of architects Kinney & Orth included the Winnebago County Courthouse, a Romanesque-style building made of red brick and trimmed with stone, built during 1896 in Forest City, Iowa.

In 1902, Orth joined Charles Buechner (1859–1924) in St. Paul. Buechner remained a partner with Orth in the architectural firm Buechner & Orth until his death in 1924.  The firm specialized in designing courthouses and theaters throughout the Midwest and was one of the most successful architectural practices of its day in the area.  Buechner & Orth was known for its use of Beaux-Arts architecture.

Buildings
Among the many buildings designed by Buechner & Orth are:

 Cleveland High School (St. Paul), 1909
 Empress Theatre (St. Paul), 1910
 Grand Theatre (Grand Forks, ND), 1919
 Labor Temple (St. Paul), 1922
 Lagoon Theatre (Minneapolis), 1915
 Luther Seminary (St. Paul), several buildings for, 1921, 1923
 Masonic Temple (St. Paul)
 Shubert Theatre (St. Paul), 1909 & 1910
 Henry Orth residence (St. Paul), 1915
 Palace Theatre (St. Paul), 1916
 St. Alexius Hospital (Bismarck, ND), 1914
 Shriners Hospital for Crippled Children (Minneapolis), 1922
 State Theatre (Sioux Falls, SD), 1925
 West Bay Club (Sand Island, WI), 1913
 Fargo Theatre (Fargo, North Dakota), 1925
 Drawings for 19 courthouses in Minnesota, and North and South Dakota, 1907–1926, and plans of nearly 100 residences, most of them in Minneapolis and St. Paul.

References

External links
Buechner & Orth designed buildings

1866 births
1946 deaths
People born at sea
20th-century American architects
American people of Norwegian descent
Architects from Saint Paul, Minnesota